Sylvia Reed Curran is a career member of the United States Foreign Service who served as the Deputy Chief of Mission and Charge d’Affaires in Turkmenistan, Ashgabat (2007–2010), and Consul General in Vladivostok, Russia (2010–2013).

Curran began with the State Department in 1987 after working in cytogenetics at the University of Chicago.  Curran earned a BS in Biology and AAS in Chemistry from the University of Alaska, studied Medical Technology at the University of Hawaii, and received an MS in National Resource Strategy from National Defense University.

References

1958 births
Living people
National Defense University alumni
University of Alaska alumni
University of Hawaiʻi alumni
University of Chicago staff
American women ambassadors
Ambassadors of the United States
Ambassadors of the United States to Turkmenistan
21st-century American women